Ashley County may refer to:

 Ashley County, Arkansas, a county in Arkansas
 Ashley County, New Zealand, a county on the South Island of New Zealand
 Ashley County, Missouri, the former name of Texas County, Missouri, from 1843 to 1845